Presidential elections were held in Madagascar on 7 November 1982. Incumbent President Didier Ratsiraka of AREMA won with over 80% of the vote. Voter turnout was 86.75%.

Results

References

Presidential elections in Madagascar
1982 in Madagascar
Madagascar
November 1982 events in Africa